BP Mandal College of Engineering, Madhepura is a government engineering college in Madhepura district of Bihar, India. It was established in the year 2016 under Department of Science and Technology, Bihar. The college is named after the name of BP Mandal, 7th chief minister of Bihar. It is affiliated with Aryabhatta Knowledge University and approved by All India Council for Technical Education.

Admission 
Admission in the college for four years Bachelor of Technology course is made through UGEAC conducted by Bihar Combined Entrance Competitive Examination Board. To apply for UGEAC, appearing in JEE Main of that admission year is required along with other eligibility criteria.

Departments 

College have four branches in Bachelor of Technology course with annual intake of 60 students in each branch.

 Civil Engineering
 Computer Science & Engineering
 Electrical & Electronics Engineering
 Mechanical Engineering

References

External links 
 Official website
 BCECE Board website
 Aryabhatta Knowledge University website
 DST, Bihar website

Engineering colleges in Bihar
Colleges affiliated to Aryabhatta Knowledge University
Educational institutions established in 2016
2016 establishments in Bihar